Steve Allrich (born Chicago, Illinois) is an American screenwriter and painter.

Biography

Movie career
Screenwriter Steve Allrich is the author of The Canyon directed by Richard Harrah and starring Will Patton, Yvonne Strahovski and Eion Bailey, and Bad Karma, starring Ray Liotta, slated for production May 2011.

Painting career
A plein aire painter as well as a screenwriter he authored the oil painting instruction book Oil Painting for the Serious Beginner (Watson-Guptill Publications, New York, 1996).

Personal 
Allrich is the father of electronic musician and composer Colin C. and screenwriter Alexander D. Allrich. He resides in Los Angeles, California with his wife, artist and blogger Karina Allrich .

References

External links 
 
 Official Site
 Official Twitter
 Official Painting Blog

Living people
1954 births
American male screenwriters
Artists from Chicago
20th-century American painters
20th-century American male artists
American male painters
21st-century American painters
21st-century American male artists
Screenwriters from Illinois